Bactrianoscythris satyrella is a moth of the family Scythrididae. It was described by Staudinger in 1880. It is found in Iran, Turkey, Kazakhstan and Turkmenistan.

References

satyrella
Moths described in 1880